"Under Enemy Arms" is a song by American rapper Trippie Redd. It was released as the lead single for his second studio album ! (2019) on May 29, 2019, with a accompanying music video. The song was produced by Hammad Beats and Matthew Crabtree.

Music video 
On May 29, 2019, Trippie Redd uploaded the music video for "Under Enemy Arms" on his own YouTube account. The music video currently has 16 million
views as of August 2021.

Charts

Certifications

References 

2019 singles
2019 songs
Trippie Redd songs
Songs written by Trippie Redd
Trap music songs